The Broken Wave is the debut album by London-based alternative rock/indie folk artist Hannah Peel, released on 31 January 2011.

Recording, production
Varying in mood and tone, The Broken Wave covers themes of "joy and hope of falling in love through to the pain and loss of betrayal". In addition to eight original songs, the album features covers of "Cailin Deas Crúite na mBó" and "The Parting Glass", two traditional Irish folk songs.

The Broken Wave was mixed at Expanding Studios (Benge Studios) in London, UK by Ben Edwards and mastered at Electric Mastering in London, UK by Guy Davie.

Critical reception

The Broken Wave has generally received positive reviews.

Matt Conner of The Line of Best Fit commended the album, stating that "the release is best described as a house of cards, maintaining a certain grace and fragility throughout the ten songs present" and lauding its "authenticity and vulnerability few singers can approach".

John Eyles of the BBC commented that the album was a "distinctive debut album" and suggested that the album's main strengths were Peel's use of "allusions and metaphors", her "insights into the break up of relationships [that] displays a maturity rare in a 28-year-old", and her voice. Eyles also noted the "fragile beauty", which "ideally conveys the longing and yearning contained within the complex emotions of the songs".

Ben Hogwood of musicOMH stated that "her songs have a fragility that makes them the musical equivalent of frosted glass, beautifully crafted but easily shattered if not handled with due care and attention" and characterised that "endearing and plaintive" Peel's voice as a strength. However, Hogwood also noted that Peel's "candidly sing[ing] of falling in and out of love, as well as relatively ordinary day to day events ... occasionally finds her tripping over her own words".

Will Fitzpatrick of The Fly gave a positive assessment of the album and claimed that Peel "wanders into territory reminiscent of Belle & Sebastian's fragile indie pop of yore", but distinguished the acts by adding "that's far from the sum of The Broken Wave's ambition". Fitzpatrick also commented that the Peel's recording of the Irish traditional folk song "The Parting Glass" transcends its Irish roots to become a memorably eerie slab of folktronica".

Track listing
All lyrics written and music composed by Hannah Peel, except where otherwise noted.

Credits
Musicians
Hannah Peel: lyrics (tracks 1–8), music (tracks 1–8), vocals, piano, synthesiser, musical box, trombone, violin, harp
Ian Burdge: cello
Lizzie Jones: trumpet (tracks 3 and 8)
Mike Lindsay: arrangement, guitar, baglama, bass, backing vocals, dulcimer, percussion
Karl Penney: drums, percussion, backing vocals
Kate Robinson: violin
Caroline Subedi: violin
Bruce White: viola

Production
Mike Lindsay: producer, arrangement
Hannah Peel: arrangement
Guy Davie: mastering
Ben Edwards: mixing
Rueben Hollenbon: engineer
Frazer Merrick: engineer (assistant)
Michael O'Shaughnessy: artwork and design
Stephen May: artwork and design
Emily Dennison: photography

References

External links
Reviews
http://drownedinsound.com/releases/15912/reviews/4141886
http://www.forfolkssake.com/reviews/8286/album-hannah-peel-the-broken-wave
http://www.beardedmagazine.com/albums/article/hannah-peel-the-broken-wave-static-caravan
https://archive.today/20120911131117/http://www.subba-cultcha.com/album-reviews/article.php?contentID=22665
The Independent

2010 albums
Hannah Peel albums